Kanwal Nauman is a Pakistani actor-turned-politician who was a Member of the Provincial Assembly of the Punjab from May 2013 to May 2018.

Early life and education
She was born on 1 January 1964 in Multan.

She completed high school level education from Women Degree College, Multan in 1983.

Political career
She joined politics in 2008.

She was elected to the Provincial Assembly of the Punjab as a candidate of Pakistan Muslim League (N) (PML-N) on a reserved seat for women in 2013 general election. In May 2018, she resigned from the Provincial Assembly of the Punjab.

Death hoax
On 1 February 2016, Nauman was erroneously reported dead. At the time, Nauman was in a critical condition and was in intensive care recovering from brain hemorrhage. On 5 April 2016, she returned to the Provincial Assembly of the Punjab after 65 days of absence.

References 

Living people
Pakistan Muslim League (N) politicians
Pakistani actor-politicians
Politicians from Punjab, Pakistan
Pakistani social workers
1964 births
Punjab MPAs 2013–2018
Women members of the Provincial Assembly of the Punjab
21st-century Pakistani women politicians